Ammodytes americanus, also known as American sand lance, American sand eel, and sand launce, is a small fish in the family Ammodytidae. First described by James Ellsworth De Kay in 1842, it is widespread in the western North Atlantic. Its back is greenish-brown, while its sides and abdomen are silvery. It has a long, low dorsal fin (described as "very delicate") which extends along most of its back, folding into a groove at the fin's base when not in use. Its anal fin is roughly the same height as the dorsal fin, and extends over the posterior third of the fish's body. Its pectoral fins are small, and its caudal fin is forked. Its mouth is large and toothless, with a lower jaw that extends well beyond the upper. It typically travels in large schools, spending most of its time relatively near the water surface. It feeds primarily on plankton, though it is known to take small clams and snails from the sea floor, presumably when plankton is scarce. They do this to avoid being detected by night-hunting species such as bluefish and stripers.

Ammodytes americanus is an important prey item for many species of fish, whales and birds. Breeding roseate terns, a federally endangered species in the United States, feed their chicks almost exclusively on the species.

References

Ammodytidae
Fish of the Atlantic Ocean
Fish described in 1842
Taxa named by James Ellsworth De Kay